Yohan Betsch (born 16 February 1987) is a French professional footballer as of 2020 who plays as a midfielder. He started his career with Metz, but did not make a first-team appearance for the club before leaving to join Créteil in 2008. After spending two seasons with Créteil, Betsch signed for Strasbourg. He returned to Metz at the start of the 2011–12 season, but left to join Laval the following summer.

Career
Betsch started his career in the reserve team at Metz and made a total of 54 appearances in the Championnat de France amateur between 2006 and 2008, scoring twice. He joined Championnat National club Créteil in the summer of 2008 and made his debut in the goalless draw at home to Calais on 2 August. He went on to play in all 38 National matches for Créteil during the 2008–09 season, and scored his first goal for the club in the 1–1 draw with Pacy-sur-Eure on 4 March 2009. Betsch was again a regular starter during the first half of his second season with Créteil, but he then spent some time out of the side due to injury before returning for the game against Cannes on 24 April 2010. In total, he made 67 league appearances during his two-year spell at the Stade Dominique Duvauchelle.

On 2 July 2010, Betsch signed for recently relegated National outfit Strasbourg. However, eight days later he ruptured ligaments in his left knee during a pre-season friendly match against German club Koblenz, an injury which required an operation and ruled him out for around six months. Betsch eventually made his Strasbourg debut on 25 February 2011, playing the first half of the 1–1 draw away at Gap before being substituted for Loïc Damour. He went on to play a total of 10 matches during the remainder of the 2010–11 season, two of them as a substitute, as the team finished fourth in the National.

Despite their fourth-placed finish, Strasbourg were demoted to the Championnat de France amateur 2 for the 2011–12 season due to financial irregularities. Many players subsequently left the club, including Betsch, who returned to his first club, Metz, on 7 June 2011. He played his first senior match for the club on 26 August 2011, almost five years after making his debut for the reserves, coming on as a late replacement for Mahamane Traoré in the 1–1 draw away at Sedan. He then spent more than two months out of the first-team, although he did make three appearances for the B team during that period.

Betsch was recalled to the senior team and handed his first start for Metz on 5 November 2011 as the team secured a 1–0 victory away at Boulogne. The match marked the beginning of eight consecutive starts for Betsch, which continued into January 2012. On 18 January 2012, he scored his first Ligue 2 goal for Metz, netting the equaliser three minutes into injury time in the 1–1 draw away to Châteauroux. Following Metz's relegation to the Championnat National at the end of the 2011–12 season, Betsch joined Ligue 2 side Laval on 19 June 2012.

Career statistics

References

External links
 
 Yohan Betsch profile at FootNational
 
 

1987 births
Living people
Sportspeople from Argenteuil
French people of German descent
French footballers
Association football midfielders
FC Metz players
US Créteil-Lusitanos players
RC Strasbourg Alsace players
Stade Lavallois players
Clermont Foot players
A.F.C. Tubize players
FC Annecy players
Ligue 2 players
Championnat National players
Footballers from Val-d'Oise